is a Japanese gymnast. She competed in six events at the 1968 Summer Olympics in Mexico City. Her husband is gymnast Mitsuo Tsukahara and son Naoya Tsukahara.

References

1947 births
Living people
Japanese female artistic gymnasts
Olympic gymnasts of Japan
Gymnasts at the 1968 Summer Olympics
People from Nagasaki